Dr. Mamta Patel Nagaraja is an American engineer and scientist, and currently the Associate Chief Scientist for Exploration and Applied Research.  In this role, she advises NASA's chief scientist on missions where humans perform science in spaceflight.  She has degrees in aerospace engineering, mechanical engineering, and biomedical engineering. Her dissertation research was in molecular biology where she studied genetic changes in bone cells exposed to simulated microgravity. She previously received two interviews to become a NASA astronaut, served on the NASA Administrator’s team, led a science communications portfolio, and served on a White House Council.

Early life and education 
Mamta Patel Nagaraja was born in Anaheim, California to parents who emigrated from India to the United States just a year earlier. The family moved to San Angelo, TX when Mamta was 2 months old to begin their life in the USA. When she was 16, her uncle had arranged for her to be married, a common practice in the Gujarati culture. Her father refused the proposal and opted to encourage his daughters to continue their education.

While giving a TEDx talk, she noted how her high school math teacher, Mrs. Bean, changed her life. Mrs. Bean handed Nagaraja a copy of the Texas A&M Full Ride Scholarship application the day before it was due and told her to apply. Nagaraja took her teacher's advice, wrote the essays and sent it as overnight shipping in order to submit the application by its due date. She was awarded the scholarship and began her formal education at Texas A&M University where she received her Bachelor of Science degree in aerospace engineering in 2003. During her tenure at Texas A&M, she was hired into NASA’s selective Cooperative Education Program. This program allowed her to gain knowledge and experience at NASA, inspiring her to further her education.

In 2005, she went on to receive a master's degree in mechanical engineering at the Georgia Institute of Technology. In 2007, she completed a doctorate in biomedical engineering at Georgia Tech with dissertation research performed in the School of Medicine at Emory University.

NASA 

Nagaraja is currently the Associate Chief Scientist for Exploration and Applied Research.  In this role, she advises NASA's chief scientist on missions where humans perform science in spaceflight. Previously, she served as the deputy program scientist for space biology at NASA. In this role, she was responsible for programmatic strategy, roadmaps, and growth of the investment in space biology. Her expertise is in molecular biology where she studied genetic changes in bone cells exposed to simulated microgravity. 

In 2008, Nagaraja began her career at NASA's Johnson Space Center training astronauts and serving as one of NASA’s certified flight controllers in the Mission Control Center in Houston, Texas. She trained astronauts who flew aboard the U.S. Space Shuttle as well as the International Space Station. 

In 2013, Nagaraja accepted an opportunity at NASA Goddard Space Flight Center to serve as an operator for a science mission to the Moon. Her role was to ensure the mass spectrometer on the Lunar Atmosphere and Dust Environment Explorer operated correctly. Then she served as the lead mechanical engineer for a scientific instrument on a proposed mission to Venus.

In 2015, Nagaraja moved to NASA Headquarters where she eventually had to opportunity to lead NASA's science communications portfolio, including executive communications for NASA's senior leaders in science, visual science graphics, and digital media (social and web). Under her leadership, NASA Science spearheaded a strategic investment in communicating science in Spanish. 

Previously, Nagaraja served in the NASA Administrator's office and was a member of the White House Council on Women and Girls, created in response to a March 2009 Executive Order during the Obama Administration.  As part of that effort, she managed the Women@NASA project and has a strong passion for encouraging young students to learn about a gamut of career options, including science and engineering. She also encourages young women to find a healthy work-life balance during the years where they may choose to have a family.  

Lastly, Dr. Nagaraja has previously served as an adjunct faculty member in the Department of Mechanical Engineering at the Catholic University of America.

Awards and Recognitions 

Nagaraja was a semi-finalist in the 2013 and 2017 astronaut candidate selections. The 2013 selection was the second largest applicant pool at that time with 6100, and the 2017 class had the most ever with over 18,000 applicants. Notably, the previous historical record was 8000 in the 1978 selection when NASA first opened up their astronaut program to women.  In 2011, Nagaraja was awarded NASA’s Exceptional Service Medal for her contributions to the International Space Station. In 2012, she was invited by then Secretary of State Hillary Clinton to the Equal Futures Forum in New York City to discuss how best to empower young women. In 2013, Nagaraja was selected by the NASA Administrator to represent NASA at the State of the Union address.  She was also the recipient of the Robert H. Goddard Exceptional Achievement in Engineering award for her significant contributions to the lunar mission called LADEE in 2013.  In 2017, Nagaraja was awarded the prestigious Fed100 award for her significant role in bringing the historical total solar eclipse to millions across the world. To date, the total solar eclipse in 2017 holds the record for the highest web traffic event in NASA's history. Nagaraja managed the live viewing on the web of the eclipse for NASA.

Public speaking 

Nagaraja has engaged with students and the general public throughout her career. She was a TEDx speaker at George Mason University where she talked about the "Power of One".  The message was that one person has the power to steer the course of a young child's life, and in this talk, Nagaraja gives three examples of teachers who steered her to a path of success.

References

External links
 25 STEM Women You Should Know
 Women and Girls Initiative, NASA
 Spacing out the Youth: Mamta Patel Nagaraja, Ph.D., Women@NASA Project Manager, National Aeronautics
 President Obama Announces White House Council on Women and Girls

Year of birth missing (living people)
Living people
American women engineers
Texas A&M University alumni
Georgia Tech alumni
Articles containing video clips
21st-century women engineers
21st-century American women